The Elliot Smith House was a historic house located at 839 Main Street in Worcester, Massachusetts. The house was listed on the National Register of Historic Places on March 5, 1980. It was demolished in 1982.

Description and history 
The -story asymmetrical wood-frame Queen Anne style house was built in 1889 for Elliot Smith, a local businessman who operated a wholesale grocery. Its porch featured elaborately turned posts and balusters, and the house was clad in wood shingles, including bands of decoratively cut shingles. There was an oriel stained glass window on the south wall. Smith lived in the house until his death in 1913. In 1945, the house was acquired by a veterans' organization, and eventually became VFW post.

See also
National Register of Historic Places listings in southwestern Worcester, Massachusetts
National Register of Historic Places listings in Worcester County, Massachusetts

References

Demolished buildings and structures in Massachusetts
Houses completed in 1889
Houses in Worcester, Massachusetts
Houses on the National Register of Historic Places in Worcester County, Massachusetts
National Register of Historic Places in Worcester, Massachusetts
Queen Anne architecture in Massachusetts
Veterans of Foreign Wars buildings
Buildings and structures demolished in 1982